A partial solar eclipse occurred on July 31, 1924. A solar eclipse occurs when the Moon passes between Earth and the Sun, thereby totally or partly obscuring the image of the Sun for a viewer on Earth. A partial solar eclipse occurs in the polar regions of the Earth when the center of the Moon's shadow misses the Earth.

Related eclipses

Solar eclipses 1924–1928

Metonic series

References

External links 

1924 7 31
1924 7 31
1924 in science
July 1924 events